Crimes of the Mind is the debut album from The Dude of Life, a childhood friend of Phish leader Trey Anastasio and a lyrical contributor to many of Phish's early songs. Phish is the backing band for the entire album.

The album was recorded in 1991 but wasn't released until 1994, following Phish's surge in popularity. The Dude of Life performed several of the songs in a live setting with Phish on a number of occasions.

The main riff of Phish's "Chalkdust Torture" was used in the song "Self."

Critical reception
AllMusic called the album a "loopy, stoned excursion that winds through Dead-style rock and hippie folk-rock." Entertainment Weekly deemed it "inconsequential silliness," writing that "the nice part is that the Dude’s ditties force Phish to keep its penchant for kitchen-sink jamming in check." Trouser Press wrote that "the music is a bit tighter than the [Phish]’s — but only a bit."

Track listing
"Dahlia"
"Family Picture"
"Self"
"Crimes Of The Mind"
"Bitchin' Again"
"TV Show"
"Trials and Tribulations"
"Lucy In The Subway"
"Ordinary Day"
"Revolution's Over"
"King Of Nothing"

Personnel
The Dude of Life: vocals

Phish
Trey Anastasio - guitars, vocals
Page McConnell - keyboards, vocals
Mike Gordon - bass, vocals
Jon Fishman - drums, vocals

References

1994 albums
Phish albums
The Dude of Life albums
Elektra Records albums